Lyonia fruticosa, the poor-grub or coastal plain staggerbush, is a plant species native to the US states of Florida, southern Georgia and the extreme southern part of South Carolina. It grows in pine woodlands and shrub bogs at elevations less than 100 meters (333 feet).

Lyonia fruticosa is an evergreen shrub up to 3 m (10 feet) tall. Leaves are broadly elliptical, up to 6 cm (2.4 inches) long. Flowers are white, urn-shaped, hanging downward. Fruit is a dry, egg-shaped capsule about 4 mm in diameter.

References

fruticosa
Flora of the Southeastern United States
Plants described in 1803
Taxa named by André Michaux
Flora without expected TNC conservation status